The Chief of Joint Operations (CJOPS) is a three-star role within the Australian Defence Force (ADF), responsible for the Joint Operations Command and joint operational deployments, such as United Nations peacekeeping and joint task groups. Until 2007, the Vice Chief of the Defence Force (VCDF) was double hatted, additionally exercising the responsibilities of CJOPS. However, in September 2007 the Minister of Defence, Brendan Nelson announced the formation of a separate CJOPS position based at the Headquarters Joint Operations Command (HQJOC) at Bungendore, New South Wales.

Joint Operations Command
The Joint Operations Command consists of Headquarters Joint Operations Command, Northern Command, and Australian Defence Force elements of the Maritime Border Command. Chief of Joint Operations is a joint position, and the incumbent can be appointed from any of the three ADF services.

Chiefs of Joint Operations
The following list chronologically records those who have held the post of CJOPS, with rank and honours as at the completion of the individual's term.

Deputy Chief of Joint Operations

See also

 Current senior Australian Defence Organisation personnel

References

Leadership of the Australian Defence Force
Military appointments of Australia